Dritan Dajti is considered as one of the most dangerous criminals in Albania. He is known for the notorious killing of four police officers in an attempt to escape his arrest on August 7, 2009.

But this is not the only thing Dajti is accused of, he was also accused of the killing of the businessman Agim Beqari on February 17, 1999. Agim Beqari was the president of "Besa Konstruksion" and was killed near "Zogu i Zi" in Tirana. During his trial, Dajti escaped from the Court of Tirana and lived on the run for more than 6 years. After 6 years, the police managed to find his location and attempted to arrest him. An exchange of fire took place at "Pista Iliria", a very crowded area in Durrës. where four police officers were killed by Dajti. He was arrested and brought to the hospital with serious injuries after the shooting. 

Dajti was convicted of four counts of murder and sentenced to four life sentences. The High Court of Albania ruled that his right to a defence lawyer had been violated, Dajti's sentence was reduced to 25 years. Dajti received medical treatment in 2021.

References

External links 
Albanian Gangster Gave Interviews On The Run (BalkanInsight.com)

Living people
Albanian gangsters
Albanian escapees
Escapees from Albanian detention
Prisoners and detainees of Albania
Year of birth missing (living people)
People convicted of murdering police officers
Albanian prisoners sentenced to life imprisonment